Code page 1101 (CCSID 1101), also known as CP1101, is an IBM code page number assigned to the UK variant of DEC's National Replacement Character Set (NRCS). The 7-bit character set was introduced for DEC's computer terminal systems, starting with the VT200 series in 1983, but is also used by IBM for their DEC emulation. Similar but not identical to the series of ISO 646 character sets, the character set is a close derivation from ASCII with only code point 0x23 differing.

Code page layout

See also
 National Replacement Character Set (NRCS)
 Code page 1013 (similar ISO 646-GB / IR-4 code  page)

References

1101